Shot put at the 2004 Summer Olympics may refer to:

 Athletics at the 2004 Summer Olympics – Men's shot put
 Athletics at the 2004 Summer Olympics – Women's shot put

es:Anexo:Atletismo en los Juegos Olímpicos de Atenas 2004 - Peso masculino
sv:Olympiska sommarspelen 2004 - Friidrott:Kula herrar